Alfie Almario (April 12, 1963 – October 3, 2001) was a Filipino former professional basketball player in the Philippine Basketball Association.

Career

Almario played collegiate basketball at DLSU and was one of the vital cogs of Northern Consolidated Cement squad which later became the core of the San Miguel Beermen.

He was noted as the Triggerman of the RP Youth team that crushed China for the ABC youth championship at the Araneta Coliseum in 1982. Among his teammates in the team were Hector Calma, Leo Austria, Derrick Pumaren, Jong Uichico, Elmer Reyes, Jun Tan, the late Teddy Alfarero and the late Rey Cuenco.  He was also part of the national team that captured the internationally acclaimed Jones Cup in 1985.

He then played for the San Miguel Beermen from 1986-1990, averaging 4.6 ppg under coach Norman Black, and was a member of the 1989 Grand Slam team.  He retired from basketball in 1990 to concentrate on coaching and golf.

Death

Almario died of a heart attack on October 3, 2001 while visiting his fish farm in Ramon, Isabela.

References

1963 births
2001 deaths
Basketball players from Cebu
Cebuano people
Philippines men's national basketball team players
Filipino men's basketball players
Power forwards (basketball)
San Miguel Beermen players
Small forwards
Sportspeople from Cebu City
De La Salle Green Archers basketball players